Sushi Masaki Saito is a Japanese restaurant run by chef Masaki Saito. It has two Michelin stars.

Saito opened the restaurant in Yorkville in 2019. He previously ran Sushi Ginza Onodera, in New York, which earned a Michelin star in 2017, and two stars in 2018.

On September 13, 2022, the first ever Michelin Guide Toronto was announced. Sushi Masaki Saito was the only restaurant given two stars.

References

Michelin Guide starred restaurants in Canada
Restaurants in Toronto